Shawn Gallagher was the National Security Council's Director for Nuclear Threat Reduction in the Obama Administration.  Gallagher was a former professional baseball player in the Texas Rangers, Kansas City Royals, and Montreal Expos organizations.  A nuclear engineer, Gallagher was the first ever student to graduate from the Massachusetts Institute of Technology (MIT) with two degrees in nuclear engineering within four years.

United States Government 

Gallagher served as the NSC Director for Nuclear Threat Reduction from June 2010 to August 2012, with primary responsibility for President Obama's nuclear security agenda including the 4-year Lockdown effort and Nuclear Security Summit process.  Gallagher is credited for innovating a new form of diplomacy, Gift Basket Diplomacy, that he helped implement through the Nuclear Security Summit preparatory process and that has since been exported to other multilateral fora such as climate change and nonproliferation negotiations. Laura Holgate who was then the NSC Senior Director for WMD Terrorism and Threat Reduction worked with the White House WMD Czar Gary Samore to first implement the policy. 

Gallagher's responsibilities also included domestic nuclear energy policy, where he was responsible for developing a policy to save several hundred million dollars on decommissioning activities within the US and was integral in securing US Government and US industry aid to Japan in response to the Fukushima nuclear disaster including the immediate delivery of UAVs to Japan assess damage without risking personnel safety.

Professional Baseball 

Gallagher spent seven seasons in professional baseball, including a stint on the Texas Rangers' 40-man roster in 1999. In 1998, Gallagher was named MVP of the Florida State League after becoming the first ever player to drive in 100 runs and score 100 runs in the same season.  During his MVP season for the Port Charlotte Rangers Gallagher hit .308 and had 26 HR, 121 RBI, 18 SB, and 111 R.  Gallagher finished his career with exactly 100 home runs.

The Texas Rangers drafted Gallagher in the 5th round of the 1995 Amateur Draft after a high school career where he rewrote the North Carolina State High School record book.  Gallagher tied a national record with a 51 game hitting streak and another one by hitting five home runs in one game.

Softball 

Gallagher is the head of the nationally-recognized Ashburn Shooting Stars youth girls softball program and the Head Coach for the Ashburn Shooting Stars 2020.  Gallagher is a vocal advocate for female sports, especially focused on the inequality in commercialism surrounding baseball and softball.

Education 

After baseball, Gallagher attended the Massachusetts Institute of Technology.  He became the first student ever to earn two degrees in Nuclear Engineering within four years. Upon graduation, MIT turned Gallagher's thesis into a patent on a radiation detection system capable of detecting nuclear weapons in cargo containerships.

References 

Year of birth missing (living people)
Living people
MIT School of Engineering alumni
American baseball players